The National Cohesion and Integration Commission (NCIC) is a government agency of Kenya. It is intended to address and reduce inter-ethnic conflicts.

The Commission was created by the National Cohesion and Integration Act following the 2007–2008 post-election crisis.

Roles
The commission's function is primarily prevention of discrimination on the basis of race or ethnicity, advocating for cohesiveness among the diverse groups in the country and enforcing the legal provisions of the National Cohesion and Integration Act 2008.

Membership 
The current membership of the Commission is:
 Samuel KobiaChairperson
 Wambui NyutuVice Chairperson
 Skitter W. OcharoSecretary
 Phillip Okundi
 Abdulaziz Ali Farah
 Danvas Makori
 Sam Kona
 Dorcas L. Kedogo

Nakuru County Peace Accord 
Nakuru County was seen as the epicenter of violence in the aftermath of the disputed 2007 presidential elections which left over 1,100 people dead and over 350,000 displaced nationwide.

The Nakuru County Peace Accord (or “Rift Valley Peace Accord”) refers to the peace agreement signed on 19 August 2012 between elders of the Agikuyu and Kalenjin communities as well as other ethnic groups of Kenya.

The agreement was signed following a 16 month-long peace process led by the National Cohesion and Integration Commission and the National Steering Committee on Peace Building and Conflict Management, with technical support from the Centre for Humanitarian Dialogue. It was designed to address sources of ethnic conflict and a history of violence in the rift valley region of Kenya.

See also 
 National Accord and Reconciliation Act 2008

References

External links 

Politics of Kenya
Government agencies of Kenya
2012 in Kenya
Law of Kenya
Kenya articles by importance